The Ringer is a 2005 American slapstick sports comedy starring Johnny Knoxville, Katherine Heigl, and Brian Cox with cameos by Terry Funk and Jesse Ventura. Directed by Barry W. Blaustein, it was produced by the Farrelly brothers. The film was released on December 23, 2005, by Fox Searchlight Pictures.

The plot centers around a neurotypical young man (Knoxville) who, as part of a scheme to pay off his debts, poses as being developmentally disabled to compete in the Special Olympics.

The film received mixed reviews, but its positive depiction of mentally disabled characters was received approvingly by multiple commentators. The film was also endorsed by the real-life Special Olympics.

Plot 

Steve Barker (Johnny Knoxville) suddenly receives a promotion at work, and is forced to fire his friend Stavi (Luis Ávalos). Steve reluctantly does so, but hires him to work around his apartment. While working, Stavi loses three fingers in a lawn-mower accident, and reveals that he does not have health insurance; Steve decides to raise $28,000 within two weeks to pay for the surgery to re-attach Stavi's fingers. 

His uncle Gary (Brian Cox), owes $40,000 in gambling debts and suggests that they fix the Special Olympics in San Marcos, Texas in order to solve both of their financial problems. Steve reluctantly enters the Special Olympics under the guise of being a high functioning young man named “Jeffy Dahmor” with a developmental disability. Gary, assuming that Steve will easily defeat the legitimate contenders, bets $100,000 that reigning champion Jimmy Washington (Leonard Flowers) won't win the gold medal. Despite initially being disgusted at pretending to be intellectually disabled, Steve goes along with it for Stavi.

During the competition, Steve falls in love with Lynn (Katherine Heigl), a volunteer for the Special Olympics. During this time, six other contestants see through Steve's act, so he tells them the truth about Stavi. As Steve decides to leave after being exposed, they tell him to stay, resolving to help Steve save Stavi's fingers and because they want to see the arrogant Jimmy lose.

In the meantime, Steve befriends the other contestants: he encourages Thomas (Bill Chott) to talk to a girl he likes, and even takes the group to see a showing of Dirty Dancing. Steve gradually gets to know Lynn more, but is dismayed to learn that she is seeing David (Zen Gesner); after Steve discovers that David was cheating behind Lynn's back, she breaks up with him. At one point, Steve feels remorse for taking part in the Special Olympics and tells a priest in a confession booth, only for the priest to punch him in the face and kick him out of church.

At the final competition, Steve's friend Glen (Jed Rees) comes in first, with Steve coming in third behind Jimmy. During the medal ceremony, Steve admits that he is not developmentally disabled, reveals his true name, and gives his medal to Thomas, who had finished fourth. Lynn, upset at Steve, rebuffs him when he attempts to apologize to her. Uncle Gary still ends up winning his bet, as his condition was that Jimmy would lose.

Six months later, Steve has quit his job and is working in theater, producing a play with the friends he made during the Special Olympics, as well as Stavi, who got his fingers reattached. Glen and the others trick Lynn into coming to the theater, and Steve starts to apologize. Lynn forgives him because Stavi told her why Steve pretended to be developmentally disabled, and they kiss.

In a mid-credits scene, Steve and his friends dance onstage with the Kids of Widney High as they perform the song "Respect".

Cast 
 Johnny Knoxville as Steve Barker
 Brian Cox as Gary Barker
 Katherine Heigl as Lynn Sheridan
 Jed Rees as Glen Chervin
 Bill Chott as Thomas Wetzig
 Edward Barbanell as Billy B'Devore
 Leonard Earl Howze  as Mark 
 Geoffrey Arend as Winston Kelso Smith
 John Taylor as Rudy 
 Luis Avalos as Stavi 
 Leonard Flowers as Jimmy Washington

Professional wrestlers Terry Funk and Jesse Ventura's cameo appearances came about due to their friendship with director Barry Blaustein, who met the pair whilst filming wrestling documentary Beyond the Mat in the late 1990s. Funk portrayed one of the debt collectors, while Ventura lent his voice as a motivational speaker on tape. ESPN sportscaster Steve Levy also appears in the movie as himself.

Production notes 

The film took seven years to get made due to its controversial subject.
The Special Olympics committee eventually agreed to endorse the film, the film makers having given them final say on the script.

Producer Farrelly is himself a longtime volunteer with Best Buddies, a group that provides mentoring program for people with intellectual disabilities, and has prominently featured characters with disabilities in his previous films such as Warren the brother of Mary in There's Something About Mary and Rocket in Stuck on You.

During the end credits, scenes from Shakespeare's Romeo and Juliet are shown being performed, ending with the Kids of Widney High performing Aretha Franklin's "Respect."

Reception 
The film-review aggregator Rotten Tomatoes lists 40% positive reviews based on 89 critics, with an average rating of 5.00/10. The site's consensus states: "Despite a few laughs and good intentions, The Ringer is too predictable to really score the points it aims for." On Metacritic, the film has a weighted average score of 46 out of 100, based on 29 critics, indicating "mixed or average reviews".

Roger Ebert gave the film three out of four stars, stating: "The movie surprised me. It treats its disabled characters with affection and respect... and it's actually kind of sweet."

Spinal Cord Injury Zone stated: "Instead of tugging at the heartstrings, The Ringer uses the typical outrageous Farrelly Brothers humor (There's Something About Mary, Stuck on You, Shallow Hal) to promote the message that just like everyone else, individuals with intellectual disabilities are people first, each with their own interests, talents, abilities and personalities. The movie also features more than 150 people with intellectual disabilities in small parts and supporting roles."

Soundtrack
 
 "Ton of Shame"-  Written by: Randy Weeks...Performed by: Randy Weeks
 "Mr. Sandman"-  Written by: Pat Ballard
 "Sweet Ride"-  Written by: Gustaf Norén and Björn Dixgård...Performed by: Mando Diao
 "Wink and a Nod"-  Written by: Tom Wolfe...Performed by: The Funny Bones
 "Merlot"-  Written by: Tom Wolfe...Performed by: The Tasters
 "Real Thing"-  Written by: Tom Wolfe...Performed by: The Shakers
 "Main Title-  Written by: Elmer Bernstein...Performed by: Elmer Bernstein
 "Calvera"-  Written by: Elmer Bernstein...Performed by: Elmer Bernstein
 "Hot Sugar"-  Written by: Sammy James Jr. and Graham Tyler...Performed by: The Mooney Suzuki
 "Girls Gone Wild"-  Written by: Karlyton Clanton, Rochad Holiday and Chris Reese...Performed by: Dirty Rat
 "We Got to Get You a Woman"-  Written by: Todd Rundgren...Performed by: Todd Rundgren
 "If She Wants Me"-  Written by: Sarah Martin, Stuart Murdoch, Richard Colburn, Mick Cooke (as Michael Cooke), Christopher Geddes, Stevie Jackson (as Stephen Jackson) and Bob Kildea-  Performed by: Belle & Sebastian
 "Piano Man"-  Written by: Billy Joel
 "My Cherie Amour"-  Written by: Stevie Wonder, Sylvia Moy and Henry Cosby
 "Kellerman's Anthem"-  Written by: Michael Goldman
 "Fox Sports Network College Basketball Theme 2001"-  Written by: Christopher Brady
 "September"-  Written by: Allee Willis, Al McKay and Maurice White...Performed by Earth Wind & Fire
 "Pretty Girls"-  Written by: Carl Brown, Shelly Goodhope, Tanesa Tavin, Daniel Brattain, Veronica Mendez, Darrell Mitchell, Albert Cota, Chantel Roquemore and Michael Monagan...Performed by: The Kids Of Widney High
 "Respect"-  Written by: Otis Redding...Performed by: The Kids Of Widney High
 "You Are Everything"-  Written by: Linda Creed and Thom Bell (as Thomas Bell)...Performed by: The Stylistics

See also
 Spain at the 2000 Summer Paralympics
 Special Olympics

References

External links
 

2000s sports comedy films
2005 films
Down syndrome in film
American independent films
Films about mental health
Films scored by Mark Mothersbaugh
Fox Searchlight Pictures films
Special Olympics
2005 independent films
Films directed by Barry W. Blaustein
2005 comedy films
2000s English-language films
2000s American films